Marianna Pensky is a professor at the University of Central Florida.
Her research interests lie in the areas of theoretical and applied statistics.

She is author of The Stress-strength Model and Its Generalizations: Theory and Applications (World Scientific Publishing, 2003).

She is a Member of the Board of Directors of the International Society for NonParametric Statistics (ISNPS), and a Fellow of the Institute of Mathematical Statistics.

References

Living people
Women statisticians
University of Central Florida faculty
Elected Members of the International Statistical Institute
Fellows of the Institute of Mathematical Statistics
Year of birth missing (living people)